Luis Francisco Romo Barrón (born 5 June 1995) is a Mexican professional footballer who plays for Liga MX club Monterrey and the Mexico national team. Mainly a defensive midfielder, he is also capable of playing as a centre-back.

Club career

Querétaro
Born in Sinaloa, Romo began his career playing for the youth squads of Cruz Azul. At the age of 15, Romo was cut by Cruz Azul, and eventually joined the youth squads of Querétaro.

He made his Liga MX debut with Querétaro on 20 July 2018, in the team's opening match of the season, against Atlas. By the 2019 Apertura, he was named club captain. It proved to be Romo's final campaign with Querétaro, playing in 17 matches and scoring three goals.

Cruz Azul
In January 2020, he joined Cruz Azul, returning to the club he had played for as a youngster. He made his league debut for the club on the 17th of the month in a 2–1 defeat to Atlético San Luis. On 25 July, he scored his first goal for La Máquina in a 3–0 victory over Santos Laguna. On 3 December, he scored his first brace in Cruz Azul's 4–0 first leg victory over Pumas UNAM in the Guardianes 2020 semi-finals. He played in the return leg of the series which Cruz Azul lost 4–0, resulting in the team's elimination 4–4 on aggregate.

Romo played an integral part in Cruz Azul's championship-winning Guardianes 2021 campaign. He played in 19 matches, scored three goals, and provided seven assists, and was named the league's best player.

International career
Romo received his first call up to the senior national team by Gerardo Martino, and made his debut on 19 November 2019 in the 2–1 CONCACAF Nations League victory against Bermuda.

Romo was called up by Jaime Lozano as one of three over-age reinforcements for the 2020 Summer Olympics in Tokyo. He won the bronze medal with the Olympic team.

In October 2022, Romo was named in Mexico's preliminary 31-man squad for the 2022 FIFA World Cup, and in November, he was ultimately included in the final 26-man roster, but did not receive any minutes on the field during the tournament.

Career statistics

Club

International

International goals
Scores and results list Mexico's goal tally first.

Honours
Cruz Azul
Liga MX: Guardianes 2021

Mexico Olympic
Olympic Bronze Medal: 2020

Individual
Liga MX Best XI: Guardianes 2020, Guardianes 2021
Liga MX Player of the Month: August 2020, February 2021, May 2021
Liga MX Most Valuable Player: Guardianes 2021
Liga MX Best Defensive Midfielder: 2020–21
Liga MX All-Star: 2021

References

External links
 
 
 
 

1995 births
Living people
Association football defenders
Mexican footballers
Mexico international footballers
Querétaro F.C. footballers
Liga MX players
Footballers from Sinaloa
People from Ahome Municipality
Footballers at the 2020 Summer Olympics
Olympic footballers of Mexico
Olympic medalists in football
Olympic bronze medalists for Mexico
Medalists at the 2020 Summer Olympics
2022 FIFA World Cup players